You Don't Know What You're Doin'! is a 1931 Warner Bros. Merrie Melodies cartoon short directed by Rudolf Ising. The short was released on October 21, 1931, and stars Piggy, one of the series' early recurring characters. First released on October 21, 1931, the film is perhaps one of the most amusing and effective of the cartoons from the studio's earliest years.

Plot
The story involves the character Piggy, who picks up his girlfriend Fluffy and takes her to a theater where a hot jazz orchestra is playing. Piggy mocks the trumpet soloist, then crashes the stage to play a corny chorus of the 1873 hit "Silver Threads Among the Gold" on the saxophone. The audience, led by three shabbily-dressed drunken dogs in the balcony, mock Piggy with the title song "You Don't Know What You're Doin,'" as Piggy defends his self-perceived "talent."

One of the tipplers (a black dog, perhaps a prototype of Goopy Geer) bounces on a drum and joins Piggy onstage. The dog drinks from a bottle of bootleg hootch (the film was made during alcohol Prohibition in the US) and belches in Piggy's face.  The fumes on his breath instantly intoxicate Piggy.   Piggy snatches the booze and runs out of the theater with the dog chasing him. He pours some of it into the radiator of an automobile, which arches its back like a frightened cat and takes Piggy for a wild ride through the city. Even the streets, lampposts, telephone poles, and background buildings seem to come to life in a loopy, drunken state.

The dog continues to chase after Piggy, but both of them eventually end up in the back of a truck which dumps them into a trash can. Both of them shout out "Whoopee!" as the cartoon comes to an end.

Music
The musical soundtrack was done by the then-nationally famous Abe Lyman Orchestra (though on some prints mis-attributed to the Gus Arnheim band), which adds a happy energy throughout the cartoon. The eccentric virtuoso trombone playing of Orlando "Slim" Martin is prominently featured. Martin played not only music but also some rather bizarre effects on his horn (the techniques he used to produce some of his sounds continue to puzzle other trombonists). His trombone solo representing the drunken automobile is especially memorable. The Schlesinger Studio had their sound effects department construct mechanical devices to roughly reproduce some of Martin's sounds, which became standard cartoon sound effects.

Colorized version

The short was redrawn colorized in 1987. This version suffered from many issues, such as poor animation, and missing frames.

Home media
You Don't Know What You're Doin'! is available on disc 3 of the Looney Tunes Golden Collection: Volume 6.

References

 Schneider, Steve (1990). That's All Folks!: The Art of Warner Bros. Animation. Henry Holt & Co.

External links
 LT&MM: The Early Years - You Don't Know What You're Doin'!
 
 

1931 films
1931 animated films
Merrie Melodies short films
American black-and-white films
Films scored by Frank Marsales
Animated films about music and musicians
Films directed by Rudolf Ising
Piggy (Merrie Melodies) films
Vitaphone short films
Films about pigs
Animated films about animals
1930s Warner Bros. animated short films